John Lee  was a Scottish-Canadian inventor and arms designer, best known for co-inventing a prototype bolt-action rifle with his brother James Paris Lee. The rifle they made led to the Lee–Metford and Lee–Enfield series of rifles.

Harrowing from Hawick, Scotland, the Lee family emigrated to Ontario in Canada . After John grew up, he moved to a small town along the Sydenham River called Wallaceburg.

The Lee Rifle's Beginning

In 1878, Lee and his brother James Paris perfected a rifle with a box magazine in Wallaceburg . This rifle later became an antecedent to the famous Lee–Enfield rifle. A well-trained shooter could fire approximately 15-30 shots a minute. The prototype was tested successfully in Wallaceburg. The rifle, still in existence, is housed at the Wallaceburg and District Museum.

John & James Paris Lee Commemorated
In the spring of 1964, Frank Mann, Wallaceburg’s local historian, and Darcy McKeough, Chatham-Kent’s M.P.P., corresponded. The letters discussed the possibility of erecting a plaque to commemorate the first test shot of the Lee rifle in Wallaceburg. The two discovered they needed the approval of the Archaeological and Historic Sites Board of Ontario (A.H.S.B.O.) to get official historic site designation.

Historians and dignitaries such as J.M.S. Careless, Richard Apted, Harry Pietersma and James Auld helped research and facilitate the investigation. In over a decade of study, few documents substantiated that the first shot occurred in Wallaceburg. Nonetheless, the A.H.S.B.O. recognized a vast amount of other evidence was undismissable. Most of the testimonials came from oral history passed down through the decedents of James Paris and John Lee. In 1975, they erected a plaque in Civic Park that stated, "Tradition holds that this (the first firing) occurred at Wallaceburg while Lee was visiting his brother John, a local foundry owner." The plaque is located in Civic Park close to the original location of John Lee’s foundry.

It is believed that the first shots occurred just outside the Lee Foundry. The target was an oak tree, on the South Side of Wallaceburg, across the Sydenham River.

Lee rifle controversy

The Lee rifle prototype has been a controversial topic. Local citizens believe that it is the original prototype. Outsiders and critics claim three rifles that date back to the period when the prototype was created.

Eugene Myszkowski, a Lee rifle historian and expert on the topic, had an interesting find when he examined "the prototype". In his opinion, the rifle pre-dates the Borchardt patent of 1882. The museum prototype differs from post-Borchardt patent rifles because it has a riveted magazine spring. Myszkowski outlines how post-Borchardt rifles were different: "[They] solder[ed] two stamped shells together, using a riveted magazine spring and a shallow magazine catch notch in the rear rip. The cartridge guide grooves were only on the upper rear of the magazine." The museum prototype has none of the later specifications.

References

External links
Wallaceburg & District Museum
A Multi-Media History of Chatham Kent

American inventors
Canadian inventors
Scottish emigrants to pre-Confederation Ontario
Scottish inventors
Firearm designers
People from Hawick
People from Chatham-Kent
Year of death missing
Year of birth missing
Immigrants to Upper Canada